The Ancient and Primeval Beech Forests of Albania encompasses the beech forests of Gashi in Valbonë Valley National Park  and Rajcë in Shebenik-Jabllanicë National Park. They form an integral section of the UNESCO World Heritage Site of Ancient and Primeval Beech Forests of the Carpathians because for their outstanding naturalistic value and the diverse biodiversity.

See also    
 World Heritage Sites of Albania
 Biodiversity of Albania
 Protected areas of Albania

References 

 

World Heritage Sites in Albania
Forests of Albania
Valbonë Valley National Park
Shebenik-Jabllanicë National Park